Rise to the Occasion is an electronica song performed by Swedish band BWO. The song was released as a third single from their fourth studio album, Big Science in Sweden, Norway, Finland and Denmark, on September 14, 2009.

Track list
Digital download 
 Rise to the Occasion (radio edit)
 Rise to the Occasion (Holter/Erixson radio edit)
 Rise to the Occasion (Freakchild remix)
 Rise to the Occasion (Skyylab remix)
 Rise to the Occasion (Holter/Erixson remix)
 Rise to the Occasion (DJ Fratze remix)
 Rise to the Occasion (Itech remix)

2009 singles
BWO (band) songs
Songs written by Alexander Bard
2009 songs
Songs written by Anders Hansson (songwriter)